A Sanctuary Within is an album by David Murray, released on the Italian Black Saint label in 1992. It features performances by Murray, Sunny Murray, Kahil El'Zabar and Tony Overwater.

Reception
The Atlantic deemed the album "a quartet program of diverse moods enlivened by drummer Sunny Murray and percussionist Kahil El'Zabar."

The AllMusic review awarded the album 4½ stars.

Track listing
 "Short and Sweet" – 6:37  
 "Mountain Song" (Overwater) – 6:21  
 "Return of the Lost Tribe" (El'Zabar) – 10:16  
 "Waltz to Heaven" – 5:33  
 "A Sanctuary Within, Pt. 1" [Duo] – 6:08  
 "A Sanctuary Within, Pt. 2" [Quartet] – 9:00  
 "Most of All" – 8:54  
 "Song for New South Africa" – 7:13  
 "Ballad for the Black Man" – 10:40  
 
All compositions by David Murray except as indicated
Recorded at Barigozzi Studio, Milano, December 13 & 14, 1991

Personnel
David Murray — tenor saxophone, bass clarinet
Tony Overwater — bass
Sunny Murray — drums
Kahil El'Zabar — percussion, sanza, vocals

References 

1992 albums
David Murray (saxophonist) albums
Black Saint/Soul Note albums